The 1992–93 Kansas State Wildcats men's basketball team represented Kansas State University as a member of the Big 8 Conference during the 1992–93 NCAA Division I men's basketball season. The head coach was Dana Altman who was in his third season at the helm.  The team played its home games at Bramlage Coliseum in Manhattan, Kansas.  The Wildcats finished with a record of 19–11 (7–7 Big 8), and received an at-large bid to the NCAA tournament as No. 6 seed in the Southeast region. Kansas State was upset by No. 11 seed Tulane in the opening round of the tournament.

Roster

Schedule and results

|-
!colspan=6 style=| Regular Season

|-
!colspan=6 style=| Big 8 Tournament

|-
!colspan=6 style=| NCAA Tournament

References

Kansas State
Kansas State
Kansas State Wildcats men's basketball seasons
1992 in sports in Kansas
1993 in sports in Kansas